The 1971 Tour de France was the 58th edition of the Tour de France, one of cycling's Grand Tours. The Tour began in Mulhouse with a prologue team time trial on 26 June, and Stage 10 occurred on 7 July with a mountainous stage from Saint-Étienne. The race finished in Paris on 18 July.

Stage 10
7 July 1971 – Saint-Étienne to Grenoble,

Stage 11
8 July 1971 – Grenoble to Orcières-Merlette,

Rest day 2
9 July 1971 – Orcières-Merlette

Stage 12
10 July 1971 – Orcières-Merlette to Marseille,

Stage 13
11 July 1971 – Albi to Albi,  (ITT)

Stage 14
12 July 1971 – Revel to Luchon,

Stage 15
13 July 1971 – Luchon to Superbagnères,

Stage 16a
14 July 1971 – Luchon to Gourette,

Stage 16b
14 July 1971 – Gourette to Pau,

Stage 17
15 July 1971 – Mont-de-Marsan to Bordeaux,

Stage 18
16 July 1971 – Bordeaux to Poitiers,

Stage 19
17 July 1971 – Blois to Versailles,

Stage 20
18 July 1971 – Versailles to Paris,  (ITT)

References

1971 Tour de France
Tour de France stages